Luqiao may refer to the following places in China:

Luqiao District (路桥区), Taizhou, Zhejiang
Luqiao, Dingyuan County (炉桥镇), town in Dingyuan County, Anhui
Luqiao, Weishan County, Shandong (鲁桥镇), town in Weishan County, Shandong
Luqiao, Sichuan, town in Garze Prefecture, Sichuan